La Vallée des Singes ("The Valley of the Monkeys") is a primate park in Romagne, France.

History
La Vallée des Singes was founded by Wim Mager who had previously founded the Apenheul Primate Park in the Netherlands in 1971, which is the first free-roaming primate park in the world.
The park, well known for its three species of great ape, first obtained gorillas in 1998, and first obtained its chimpanzees from the TNO in 2004.
La Vallée des Singes is famous for its group of bonobos; with the largest group in captivity as of 2016 numbering at 20 individuals. The zoo has had five successful births for this critically endangered species.

Animals
As of 2016, the park is home to 32 species of primate, including 
 Barbary macaques
 Black howler monkeys
 Black lemurs
 Black-and-white ruffed lemurs
 Black-capped squirrel monkeys
 Bonobos
 Brown spider monkeys
 Coppery titis
 Crowned lemurs
 Emperor tamarins
 Geladas
 Golden lion tamarins
 Golden-bellied capuchins
 Golden-headed lion tamarins
 Lesser spot-nosed monkeys
 Mandrills
 Mantled guerezas
 Pileated gibbons
 Pygmy marmosets
 Red ruffed lemurs
 Red-bellied lemurs
 Red-faced spider monkeys
 Red-handed tamarins
 Ring-tailed lemurs
 Roloway monkeys
 Silvery marmosets
 Southern white-cheeked gibbons
 Western chimpanzees
 Western lowland gorillas
 White-belted black-and-white ruffed lemurs
 White-faced saki monkeys
 White-fronted marmosets
 White-headed capuchins
 Woolly monkeys

Notes

External links

Zoos in France
Buildings and structures in Vienne
Tourist attractions in Vienne
Organizations based in Nouvelle-Aquitaine